The 1944 NCAA Golf Championship was the sixth annual NCAA-sanctioned golf tournament to determine the individual and team national champions of men's collegiate golf in the United States. The tournament was held at the Inverness Club in Toledo, Ohio.

Notre Dame claimed the team title, the Fighting Irish's first national championship (at an NCAA-sponsored event). The individual title was won by Louis Lick from Minnesota.

Contested during the midst of World War II, only five teams contested the 1944 tournament, a decrease of two from the seven teams that participated in the previous year's event.

Team results

 Note: Defending champions Yale did not qualify.

References

NCAA Men's Golf Championship
Golf in Ohio
NCAA Golf Championship
NCAA Golf Championship
NCAA Golf Championship